The Wandlitzer See (colloquial also Wandlitzsee) is a lake in Wandlitz, Brandenburg, Germany. At an elevation of 48.6 m, its surface area is 2.15 km².

Lakes of Brandenburg
Barnim